Cymodema is a genus of true bugs in the family Cymidae. There are about seven described species in Cymodema.

Species
These seven species belong to the genus Cymodema:
 Cymodema angustiformis Linnavuori, 1978
 Cymodema barberi Hamid, 1975
 Cymodema basicornis (Motschulsky, 1863)
 Cymodema breviceps (Stal, 1874)
 Cymodema mauritii (Stal, 1859)
 Cymodema robusta Linnavuori, 1978
 Cymodema tabidum Spinola, 1837

References

Lygaeoidea
Articles created by Qbugbot